The Taiwan Halal Integrity Development Association (THIDA) is a certification body that produces Halal certificates in the Republic of China. The association is based in the Taipei Cultural Mosque in Taipei.

History
THIDA was inaugurated on 7 May 2011 in Taipei. The opening ceremony was attended by association managers, economic representatives, business people and around 300 Taiwan Halal Good Association companies and their relevant factions in Taiwan. It is also the member of World Halal Food Council.

Objectives
The objectives of this association is:
 Ensure the Halal-ness to all Muslim consumers anywhere in the world
 Protect the Halal integrity of local certification bodies from mistakes or mishandling by a few black sheep
 Avoid consequences from such mistakes that may affect interests of other law-abiding companies
 Allow sharing of the limited resources of each individual mosque in both the shariah and technical fields

Organization charts
 General Assembly
 Board of Directors and Supervisors
 President
 Secretaries
 Halal Industry Promotion
 Trade Show
 Business Integration
 International Relations
 Halal Certification
 Evaluation and Examination
 Audit and Supervision
 Education and Training
 Administration
 Legal Affairs
 Finance
 Documents
 Consultation
 Collaboration
 Industry Advisory

See also
 Islamic dietary laws
 Islam in Taiwan
 Taiwan Halal Center

References

External links
  

2011 establishments in Taiwan
Halal food
Islamic organizations based in Taiwan
Islamic organizations established in 2011
Organizations based in Taipei